The Pruzhonka is a river in Moscow Oblast, Russia. It is a left tributary of the Vorya. Source near the village of Petrovskoye, Shchyolkovsky District of Moscow Oblast. Flows all over on the south and south-east entering the Vorya near the village of Mizinovo.

References 

 Russian: Wagner B.B. Rivers and lakes near Moscow. — M.: Veche, 2007. P. 301–302. .
 Russian: Official website of the Administration of Schelkovsky district of Moscow Oblast. Nature of Schelkovsky district.

Rivers of Moscow Oblast